Jonata de Oliveira Bastos  (born 26 November 1997), simply known as Jonata, is a Brazilian professional footballer who plays as a forward for Portuguese club Oliveirense.

Professional career
Jonata started his professional career at CRB in his native state. After an outstanding performance in the 2017 Campeonato Alagoano, he was loaned to Cruzeiro until February 2018. He first started at Cruzeiro's U20 team. Playing at the Campeonato Brasileiro Sub-20, he had several highlighted performances for the team. Leading Cruzeiro's U20 team in goals scored and helping the team to get the Campeonato Brasileiro Sub-20 title. In the absence of several Cruzeiro's forwards due to injuries, Cruzeiro's coach Mano Menezes promoted him to the senior team. On November 5, 2017 he debuted for Cruzeiro on the match against Clube Atlético Paranaense. Jonata replaced Giorgian De Arrascaeta in the game's 84th minute. On November 15, he started his first match for Cruzeiro. Playing 56 minutes in the tie against Avaí FC.

References

External links

Jonata at playmakerstats.com (English version of ogol.com.br)

1997 births
Living people
Brazilian footballers
Association football forwards
Campeonato Brasileiro Série A players
Campeonato Brasileiro Série B players
Liga Portugal 2 players
Campeonato de Portugal (league) players
Clube de Regatas Brasil players
Cruzeiro Esporte Clube players
G.D. Estoril Praia players
S.C. Braga B players
F.C. Alverca players
Vila Nova Futebol Clube players
U.D. Oliveirense players
Brazilian expatriate footballers
Brazilian expatriate sportspeople in Portugal
Expatriate footballers in Portugal